Wakapallqa (Quechua waka cow (a borrowing from Spanish, pallqa, p'allqa bifurcation, hispanicized spelling Huagapalca) is a mountain in the Andes of Peru, about  high. It lies in the Arequipa Region, Castilla Province, Andagua District. Wakapallqa is situated northeast of Puma Ranra  and southeast of Usqullu and Usqullu Lake.

References 

Mountains of Peru
Mountains of Arequipa Region